Sheets is a surname. Notable people with the name include:

 Andy Sheets (born 1971), former Major League Baseball player
 Ben Sheets (born 1978), former Major League Baseball pitcher
 Bob Sheets (born 1937), American meteorologist, director of the National Hurricane Center from 1987 to 1995
 Brittany Sheets (born 1988), better known as Mars Argo, American singer-songwriter and Internet personality
 Darrell Sheets and his son Brandon, buyers in the reality TV series Storage Wars
 Gavin Sheets (born 1996), American baseball player
 Jim Sheets (born 1931), former member of the Arkansas House of Representatives
 John M. Sheets (1854–1930), Ohio Attorney General
 John Richard Sheets (1922–2003), American Catholic bishop
 Kory Sheets, American college football player
 Larry Sheets (born 1959), former Major League Baseball player
 Millard Sheets (1907–1989), American painter

See also
 Eric Haber, American professional poker player, nicknamed Sheets
 Sheet (disambiguation)